Imam Suroso (10 January 1964 – 27 March 2020) was an Indonesian politician who served as a member of the House of Representatives for three periods, 2009–2014, 2014–2019 and 2019–2020.

Biography 
Imam was born in Pati, Central Java, precisely on 10 January 1965. After graduating from the SMA Nasional, Pati, he was accepted as a member of the Indonesian National Police, after few months of training at the Watukosek Pusdikpol, Sidoarjo, East Java. He began his career as a member of the Indonesian National Police, after completing the Prospective Bintara School (Secaba) in 1987 and continuing the Candidate Officer School (Secapa) in 2004.

Shortly thereafter, he married and has three daughters. When he was assigned as Bripdapol, he served in Pati Police Station. Imam was interested in the world of mysticism, exploring world of paranormal, earning the nickname of "Mbah Roso".

To make a living, he worked part-time as a security of Kembangjoyo Restaurant, Pati. In the 1996s, Imam Suroso worked concurrently, as a police, paranormal, and as a "security".

Educational history 

 SD Negeri Puri I Pati (1972—1978)
 SMP Muhammadiyah Pati (1978—1981)
 SMA Nasional Pati, natural science major. (1981—1984)
 Faculty of Social and Political Science, Universitas Bojonegoro (1993—1998)
 Law, Bung Karno University (2009—2012)
 Management, STM IMMI (2000—2003)

Death

On 21 March 2020, after visiting Pasar Baru to inform the locals about the risks of COVID-19, Imam started experiencing a fever and sore throat. He asked to be tested for COVID-19 and the test was carried out on the same day; he, his family and members of his sfaff were required to self-isolate for 14 days. On 22 March, his daughter reported that he had increasingly severe cough; on the following night, Imam was hospitalized at Karyadi Hospital in Semarang. On 24 March, three of the staff members who had accompanied him to Pasar Baru also started to experience fever, sore throat and cough. On 25 March, it was reported that Imam was suffering from pneumonia, and on the following day, that preparations were made to place him on a ventilator as his oxygen saturation levels had fallen to 80-81 percent. On 27 March, he died at the hospital. Melki Lana Lena, deputy chairman of the IX DPR Commission, confirmed that Imam's cause of death was COVID-19.

References

External links 
 Imam Suroso Profile at DPR's official website
 Imam Suroso Profile at Merdeka.com

1964 births
2020 deaths
Indonesian Muslims
People from Pati Regency
Indonesian Democratic Party of Struggle politicians
Deaths from the COVID-19 pandemic in Indonesia